Mission Innovation is a global initiative to accelerate public and private clean energy innovation to address climate change, make clean energy affordable to consumers, and create green jobs and commercial opportunities.

History
Mission Innovation was announced at COP21 on 30 November 2015 by President Obama of the United States, on behalf of the founding Governments. At the same time Bill Gates launched Breakthrough Energy. Also on stage for the launch was President Hollande of France and Prime Minister Modi of India.

At the launch, 20 countries committed to double their respective clean energy research and development over the five years to 2020. For the US Department of Energy, this translates into an additional $4 billion by the end of 2020. The countries include the five most populous (as at 2015): China, India, the United States, Indonesia, and Brazil. All 20 launch partner countries represent 75 percent of the world's  emissions from electricity, and over 80 percent of the world's clean energy R&D investment.

Scientists, academics, and officials who had called for a Global Apollo Programme earlier in 2015 commented that the group should set a specific target to make clean electricity cheaper to produce than coal, preferably by 2025.

Technology focus
In November 2016, the member governments agreed to co-ordinate their efforts around seven "Innovation Challenges," and added an eighth Innovation Challenge in 2018. They are:

 Smart grids
 Off-grid access to electricity
 Carbon capture
 Sustainable biofuels
 Converting sunlight into solar fuels
 Clean energy materials to sequester carbon in useful materials
 Affordable heating & cooling of buildings
 Renewable and clean hydrogen

Participating countries
The following are founder members:

 Australia
 Brazil
 Canada
 Chile
 China
 Denmark
 France

 Germany 
 India
 Indonesia
 Italy
 Japan
 Republic of Korea
 Mexico

 Netherlands
 Norway
 Saudi Arabia
 United Arab Emirates
 United Kingdom
 United States

See also 
Breakthrough Energy
Global Apollo Programme
International Energy Agency
International Renewable Energy Agency
World Economic Forum

External links
 mission-innovation.net

References

2015 in the environment
2015 in Paris
United Nations climate change conferences
Government research
Renewable energy
Research and development
Sustainable energy
Bill Gates